Dejan Pavlovic (born 23 January 1971 in Helsingborg) is a former Swedish footballer.

He is of Croatian descent. Sporting long hair and a bear, he has been called a "cult hero" in the Norwegian club Bryne FK.

References

1971 births
Living people
Sportspeople from Helsingborg
Swedish people of Croatian descent
Swedish footballers
Association football forwards
Helsingborgs IF players
Högaborgs BK players
Malmö FF players
Kavala F.C. players
Anorthosis Famagusta F.C. players
Bryne FK players
Landskrona BoIS players
Allsvenskan players
Super League Greece players
Cypriot First Division players
Eliteserien players
Swedish expatriate footballers
Expatriate footballers in Greece
Swedish expatriate sportspeople in Greece
Expatriate footballers in Cyprus
Swedish expatriate sportspeople in Cyprus
Expatriate footballers in Norway
Swedish expatriate sportspeople in Norway